OkadaBooks is a self-publishing and bookselling platform based in Nigeria, founded by Okechukwu Ofili in 2013. It was selected by Google's "Google for Start-up Accelerator" in 2017. In 2018, it hosted a writing competition in partnership with Guaranty Trust Bank called "Dusty Manuscript".

History 
OkadaBooks was founded by Okechukwu Ofili in 2013. The name is a combination of okada – a motorcycle taxi typically used to circumvent traffic in Nigeria and other West African countries – and books. The platform was started when the founder was still an author at BellaNaija and YNaija, and was frustrated at the fact that bookshops were not paying him for books already sold. OkadaBooks offers books as mobile phone downloads.

References

External links
 

Companies based in Lagos
Digital press
Self-publishing companies
Self-publishing online stores